Donald Angus Beaton (1912–1981) was a Canadian blacksmith and a Cape Breton-style fiddler.

Early life
Beaton was the son of Angus R. Beaton (Aonghas Raonuill) and Annie Belle Campbell.

Career
Beaton performed traditional fiddle tunes, as well as more than 50 of his own compositions. He was well known as a dance fiddler.

He often played and recorded with family members. The albums The Beatons Of Mabou - Marches, Jigs, Strathspeys & Reels of the Highland Scot and Cape Breton Fiddle and Piano Music, The Beaton Family of Mabou feature his compositions played by his family.  He also published a book of his tunes.

Discography
The Beatons Of Mabou - Marches, Jigs, Strathspeys & Reels of the Highland Scot . Rounder LP 7011  The Smithsonian Folkways Recordings 
Cape Breton Fiddle and Piano Music, The Beaton Family of Mabou Smithsonian Folkways 40507
Live at the House

Publications
Donald Angus Beaton's Cape Breton Scottish Violin Music.  Cranford Publishers. Englishtown, Nova Scotia. 1987.

Personal life
His son is the Cape Breton fiddler Kinnon Beaton.  Andrea Beaton, Kinnon's daughter is also a fiddler.

References 

1912 births
1981 deaths
Canadian male violinists and fiddlers
Musicians from Nova Scotia
Cape Breton fiddlers
20th-century Canadian violinists and fiddlers
20th-century Canadian male musicians